Almirante Óscar Viel was an icebreaker in service with the Chilean Navy in 1995–2019. Originally built for the Canadian Coast Guard as CCGS Norman McLeod Rogers, named for former Canadian Member of Parliament and cabinet minister Norman McLeod Rogers (1894–1940), the vessel was acquired by Chile in 1994 and renamed after Counter Admiral Óscar Viel y Toro (1837–1892), the commander of the Chilean naval forces from 1881 to 1883 and 1891.

Design and description

As built, the vessel was equipped with a CODAG system composed of four diesel engines and two gas turbines powering two electric motors driving two shafts. It was the first application of the system in icebreakers in the world. In 1982, the gas turbines were replaced with four Fairbanks-Morse 38D8-1/8 diesel engines ( sustained) with four GE generators generating  and two Ruston RK3CZ diesel engines ( sustained) with two GE generators generating  driving two shafts creating 12,000 hp total.

The ship could operate one helicopter. In Canadian service, the icebreaker had a complement of 55 but after entering Chilean service in 1995, this was reduced to 33. Other changes to the ship following the Chilean takeover was the addition of two Oerlikon 20 mm cannon and the operation of the Chilean Navy MBB Bo 105 helicopters.

Service

Canadian Coast Guard
The icebreaker was constructed by Canadian Vickers at their shipyard in Montreal, Quebec with the yard number 289 and was launched on 25 May 1968. Norman McLeod Rogers entered into service with the Canadian Coast Guard in October 1969 for use mainly as an icebreaker but to also tend to the large buoys that were replacing lightships.

In 1974, Norman McLeod Rogers performed hydrographic survey work in the Arctic, surveying around Bathurst Island for possible gas pipeline construction. In 1975, while on a scientific mission in Ungava Bay, the icebreaker went to the aid of Aigle d'Ocean, a small cargo ship that overturned in a storm. Norman McLeod Rogers dispatched its helicopter to investigate before arriving on the scene. Contact with the helicopter was soon lost, but the icebreaker arrived at the scene of the sinking merchant vessel in time to rescue five people. A Hercules aircraft was sent to search for the helicopter, which had crashed into a hillside killing both crewmembers.

In 1982, the Coast Guard, unhappy with Norman McLeod Rogerss experimental diesel and gas-powered propulsion system, had the gas turbines removed and diesel engines put in their place. Norman McLeod Rogers was transferred to the West Coast of Canada in 1990. The ship was placed in reserve soon after and transferred to Crown Assets Distribution for disposal in 1994. The ship was renamed 1220 in 1994 before being sold to the Chilean Navy on 20 December 1994.

Chilean Navy
The ship entered into service with the Chilean Navy on 14 January 1995. The icebreaker was renamed Almirante Óscar Viel and was placed into service as a replacement for the discarded Piloto Pardo. The ship's primary use with the Chilean Navy was as the Antarctic patrol and survey ship, making its first patrol in Antarctica in 1995.

The ship was decommissioned in February 2019 and later sunk as target.

References

Notes

Sources

External links 
 Chilean Navy's site for the Contraalmirante Oscar Viel Toro.

Icebreakers of the Chilean Navy
Ships built in Quebec
1968 ships